The Bath and North East Somerset Council election was held on 5 May 2011 to elect 65 local councillors for Bath and North East Somerset Council. Following the election, a minority Liberal Democrat administration was formed. Cllr Paul Crossley became leader of the council.

Election results

Ward results
The ward results listed below are based on the changes from the 2007 elections, not taking into account any party defections or by-elections. Sitting councillors are marked with an asterisk (*).

Abbey

Bathavon North

Bathavon South

Bathavon West

Bathwick

Chew Valley North

Chew Valley South

Clutton

Combe Down

Farmborough

High Littleton

Keynsham East

Marie Longstaff was previously elected under her maiden name Marie Brewer

Keynsham North

Keynsham South

Kingsmead

Lambridge

Lansdown

Lyncombe

Mendip

Midsomer Norton North

Midsomer Norton Redfield

Newbridge

Odd Down

Oldfield

Paulton

Peasedown

Publow with Whitchurch

Radstock

Saltford

Southdown

Timsbury

Twerton

Walcot

Westfield

Westmoreland

Weston

Widcombe

By-elections between 2011 and 2015

Chew Valley North

Bathavon North

References

2011 English local elections
2011
2010s in Somerset